(January 7, 1907 – January 18, 1992) was a Japanese film director. Tanaka directed the second instalment of the Japanese film series Gamera, and also directed Kenshin, The Great Wall and Typhoon Reporter.

Selected filmography 

 Tokai no hatoba (1932)
 Haha (1939)
 Aijin no chikai (1940)
 The Battle of Hong Kong (1942)
 Kyohan sha (1958)
 Tokyo onigiri musume (1961)
Kenshin (1961)
 The Great Wall (1962)
Typhoon Reporter (1963)
 Furin (1965)
 Gamera vs. Barugon (1966)
 Woman Gambling Den (1966)
 The Suitors (1967)
 The Woman Gambler and the Nun (1968)
 The Woman Gambler's Supplication (1968)
 Onna tobakushi jūban shōbu (1969)

References

External links 
 

Japanese film directors
1907 births
1992 deaths